Clanis schwartzi is a species of moth of the family Sphingidae. It is found from central and southern China to northern Laos and northern Vietnam.

References

Clanis
Moths described in 1993